Pickerel Lake is a lake in Freeborn County, in the U.S. state of Minnesota.

Pickerel Lake was named for its stock of pickerel fish.

See also
List of lakes in Minnesota

References

Lakes of Minnesota
Lakes of Freeborn County, Minnesota